Count of Villada is a hereditary title in the peerage of Spain, granted in 1625 by Philip IV to Enrique Pimentel, a Spanish statesman who was son of the 2nd Marquess of Távara.

Count of Villada (1625)

Enrique Pimentel y Enríquez, 1st Count of Villada
Antonio Pimentel y Álvarez de Toledo, 2nd Count of Villada
Enrique Enríquez de Pimentel y Osorio, 3rd Count of Villada
Ana María Pimentel y Fernández de Córdoba, 4th Countess of Villada
Teresa Pimentel y Fernández de Córdoba, 5th Countess of Villada
Luisa Pimentel y Fernández de Córdoba, 6th Countess of Villada
Ana María Pimentel y Fernández de Córdoba, 7th Countess of Villada
Miguel Álvarez de Toledo y Pimentel, 8th Count of Villada
Pedro de Alcántara Álvarez de Toledo y Silva, 9th Count of Villada
Pedro de Alcántara Álvarez de Toledo y Salm-Salm, 10th Count of Villada
Pedro de Alcántara Téllez-Girón y Beaufort Spontin, 11th Count of Villada
Mariano Téllez-Girón y Beaufort Spontin, 12th Count of Villada
Manuel Álvarez de Toledo y Lesparre, 13th Count of Villada
María de las Mercedes de Arteaga y Echagüe, 14th Countess of Villada
Luis Morenés y de Arteaga, 15th Count of Villada
Luis Morenés y Areces, 16th Count of Villada
Luis Morenés y Sanchiz, 17th Count of Villada

See also
Spanish nobility

References

Counts of Spain
Lists of Spanish nobility
Noble titles created in 1625